Based on a True Story is an upcoming American comedy thriller created by Craig Rosenberg and Jason Bateman, and will star Kaley Cuoco. The series will premiere on Peacock.

Cast
 Kaley Cuoco as Ava Bartlett
 Chris Messina as Nathan

Production
On April 11, 2022, it was announced that Peacock had given a straight-to-series order to a comedy thriller series created by Craig Rosenberg and Jason Bateman. On August 8, 2022, it was announced that Kaley Cuoco had joined the main cast as a realtor, Ava Bartlett. On October 7, 2022, it was announced that Chris Messina had been cast as Nathan, the husband of Ava.

The series will be executive produced by Jason Bateman and Michael Costigan through Aggregate Films, and Craig Rosenberg. Roxie Rodriguez will serves as co-executive producer for Aggregate Films. Production companies for the series include Aggregate Films and Universal Content Productions.

References

External links
 

2020s American comedy television series
American thriller television series
English-language television shows
Peacock (streaming service) original programming
Upcoming comedy television series
Television series by Universal Content Productions